Beers Brook is a river in Delaware County, New York. It flows into the West Branch Delaware River by Beerston. Beers Brook flows through Russ Gray Pond.

References

Rivers of New York (state)
Rivers of Delaware County, New York
Tributaries of the West Branch Delaware River